"Young Forever" is a song by The Ready Set released from his EP, Feel Good Now. It is the first single off the record and was released on March 1, 2011. The song was serviced to radio in the United States on March 15, 2011.

Background
"Young Forever" was released by The Ready Set on March 1, 2011. Operator was released as the second song for the single as part of the deluxe download. Witzigreuter describes the song as "different." In an interview he explains:

In 2012, Witzigreuter performed the song in an episode of Disney Channel's So Random!.

Chart performance
"Young Forever" peaked at number 39 on the Billboard Mainstream Top 40 chart, lasting 3 weeks, as well as peaking at number 45 on the Billboard Pop Digital Song Sales. It also peaked at number 5 on the Billboard Bubbling Under Hot 100 chart.

Music video
The music video for "Young Forever" premiered on MTV on April 19, 2011 and currently has 6.2 million views. In the video, Witzigreuter uses a "Freeze Time" iPhone app to suspend the movements of other people in the hotel aside from a couple of female fans and his backing band. Throughout the video, they are seen throwing streamers in the hallways, bombing unsuspecting people with silly string and raising havoc. The band is also seen rocking out in the hotel lobby.

Track listing
Digital download

Charts

Release history

References

2011 songs
Songs written by Kara DioGuardi
Songs written by Kshmr
Song recordings produced by the Cataracs